The Newton Gateway to Mathematics (formerly known as the Turing Gateway to Mathematics - TGM) is a knowledge exchange centre at the University of Cambridge in the UK. As a knowledge intermediary for the mathematical sciences, it is overseen by the Isaac Newton Institute and the Centre for Mathematical Sciences. The Newton Gateway to Mathematics is an intermediary for knowledge exchange for both professional and academic users of mathematics. Each year the Newton Gateway organises multiple events and workshops that feature expert speakers from various industries, governments and scientific organisations that discuss mathematical technical and models, presented by leaders from diverse backgrounds, such as the health care and finances.

Goals
A primary function of the Newton Gateway to Mathematics is to provide a research site and knowledge pool for the transfer, translation, exchange and dissemination of mathematical knowledge and for specific problem solving. It brings together individuals and groups with a deep interest in expanding knowledge about math and science. The organisation's events attract international attendees, from the UK and Europe as well as the USA. These events include programmes that can be applied to industrial operations, academic research and community projects.

History
The Newton Gateway to Mathematics began in 2013 seed financed by the University of Cambridge's Higher Education Innovation Funding. Subsequent funding came from corporate and philanthropic partners. Originally named after the UK computer scientist and mathematician Alan Turing (1912–1954), the initiative was set up as a gateway to mathematics for people to gain a deeper insight on problem solving. It rebranded to become the Newton Gateway to Mathematics in January 2019.

Turing helped decrypt German military codes for the UK government during World War II. Following the war he designed the Automatic Computing Engine (ACE), an early electronic stored-programme computer based on a paper Turing wrote in 1945 called "Proposed Electronic Calculator."

One of the first initiatives that set programmes in motion at the Turing Gateway to Mathematics was the 1st UK workshop on Optimisation in Space Engineering (OSE) in November 2013. Held in Birmingham, this workshop in association with the European Space Agency (ESA) and the University of Southampton, discussed issues for reaching technological solutions such as:
 interplanetary trajectory optimisation
 non-circular spacecraft orbits
 landing trajectories
A follow-up workshop on Optimisation in Space Engineering laid the groundwork for identifying challenges in the UK's aerospace industry. A third OSE workshop in September 2015 planned future workshops to further discuss problems and solutions for space engineering.

In 2014 and 2015 a programme was presented to explore solutions for the public sector, funded by the Engineering and Physical Sciences Research Council (EPSRC). Following a launch event at the Royal Society in London, subsequent events attracted delegates from government and academic organisations to focus on mathematics and public policy issues. The main themes consisted of the following:
 mathematics for future cities systems
 mathematical modelling of transport 
 energy systems relating to modelling variability
 environment and climate change probability modelling
 health and society workshop associated with math insights
 understanding data from various perspectives
 optimisation of immunisation programmes
 ageing population preparation and shifting demographics
 health and disability modelling

The Newton Gateway to Mathematics began publishing its quarterly newsletter in January 2015. This publication keeps partners and other interested individuals up to data on its events, programmes and workshops. Throughout its inception, the Newton Gateway has played a key role in bringing together scientists to discuss various types of multimodal clinical imaging that has addressed the challenges involved with solutions for cancer, heart disease and antibiotic-resistant bacteria, among other major health concerns.

Multimodality analysis has also been applied to Big Data involving advanced concepts from biology to medicine at these gatherings. Cutting edge imaging technologies have been showcased, such as multi-contrast magnetic resonance tomography (MRT), positron emission tomography (PET) and dynamic imaging. This technology targets engineers, mathematicians, biologists and other scientists who work with big data analytics.

Over the years the Newton Gateway to Mathematics has branched out into covering diverse themes that span the entire field of mathematics. With its acclaimed personnel and partners, it aspires to be one of the most intriguing and informative centres for mathematical and scientific knowledge sharing in the world. Its affiliation with the University of Cambridge, one of the longest-running campuses of all time, and the Isaac Newton Institute, give it a prestigious profile, which is why it attracts prominent experts in the fields of math and science for speaking opportunities.

In 2017, events that took place included the Environmental Modelling in Industry Study Group, Developments in Healthcare Imagine – Connecting with Academia, Data Sharing and Governance and the 2nd Edwards Symposium.

In January 2019, the organisation rebranded, changing its name to the Newton Gateway to Mathematics in order to avoid confusion with other organisations.

Location and buildings
 The Newton Gateway is located at 20 Clarkson Road, Cambridge, CB3, OEH, UK at the University of Cambridge, about 50 miles north of London. The Faulkes Gatehouse, located within the University of Cambridge's Centre for Mathematical Sciences Site, was financed by the Dill Faulkes Educational Trust (DFET). Construction of the building, which consists of a semi-circular room for seminars and three offices, was completed in June 2001. The seminar room has a capacity for 50 people. Two of the three offices are occupied by the Newton Gateway to Mathematics.

Organisation and administration
The Newton Gateway employs three full-time staff members, in which the Manager is responsible to the Director of the Isaac Newton Institute. The Isaac Newton Institute's Management Committee oversees the budget for both the Gateway's short-term and long-term fiscal planning, while the Gateway to Mathematics' staff handles day-to-day work. Ultimately, the Isaac Newton Institute's Director is head of the entire operation. The current staff, as of 2018, includes Manager Jane Leeks, Knowledge Exchange Coordinator Clare Merritt and Events and Marketing Coordinator Lissie Hope.

Profile and mission
A major goal of the Newton Gateway to Mathematics is to widen overall access to mathematics and accelerate learning curves for developing math skills. As a knowledge facilitator, the Gateway to Mathematics helps connect experts with knowledge seekers, particularly business executives who want to improve their companies with more efficient technology. The events cover a broad range of disciplines related to science and mathematics. In other words, every area of maths is considered in the Newton Gateway to Mathematics' planning for knowledge sharing events. These events are designed to help attendees learn solutions to organisational problems, frequently involving data management. Among the contributors are renowned scientists like Onno Bokove, Carola-Bibiane Schönlieb, John Aston, Patrick Wolfe, Sofia Olhede, Sofia Olhede, Mike Cates, Mike Cates, Raphael Blumenfeld or Mark Warner, FRS.

While some meetings can be characterised as industry conferences, others are more casual receptions for networking. Annual dinners also give members opportunities to expand contacts and share information. As a catalyst to stimulate thinking on maths problems, the Newton Gateway to Mathematics looks for innovative approaches to make maths more understandable. This strategy, as an example, helps inject new ideas into analysis of UK economic issues and managing health care data. Types of professionals who may be asked as guest speakers include:

 accountants
 medical professionals 
 science community researchers
 economists and financial analysts
 math professors
 investors and fund managers
 banking professionals
 government officials
 tax consultants and financial planners
 technology leaders 
 aerospace engineers

The Newton Gateway to Mathematics sometimes partners with the external organisations to deliver Open for Business events. Another example of an event which involves lunches, dinners and hotel accommodations, is the tribute to 20th century renowned applied mathematics author Joseph "Joe" Keller in 2017. Supporters of programmes beyond Isaac Newton Institute and University of Cambridge include University of Oxford, Cambridge University Press, Schlumberger and the Institute of Mathematics and its Applications.

One of the main ways for organisations and individuals to get involved with the Newton Gateway to Mathematics and gain access to its knowledge sharing activities is to become a member of the Newton Gateway to Mathematics Partnership Scheme. Partners get to attend exclusive events where they can network with academic, government and corporate representatives to gain further insights on mathematical problem solving. The group organises about 15–20 events per year. Additionally, partners can promote their brands on the initiative's website and newsletters, as well as get visibility in the Newton Gateway to Mathematics' Annual Report.

References

External links

Interactive map of the Mathematical Sciences site including links to the departments.

2013 establishments in England
Research institutes established in 2013
Mathematical institutes
Faculty of Mathematics, University of Cambridge
Research institutes in Cambridge
Alan Turing